Gillian Forde (born 5 November 1967) is a Trinidad and Tobago sprinter. She competed in the women's 100 metres at the 1984 Summer Olympics.

References

External links
 

1967 births
Living people
Athletes (track and field) at the 1984 Summer Olympics
Trinidad and Tobago female sprinters
Olympic athletes of Trinidad and Tobago
Athletes (track and field) at the 1982 Commonwealth Games
Athletes (track and field) at the 1983 Pan American Games
Commonwealth Games competitors for Trinidad and Tobago
Pan American Games competitors for Trinidad and Tobago
Central American and Caribbean Games gold medalists for Trinidad and Tobago
Competitors at the 1982 Central American and Caribbean Games
Place of birth missing (living people)
Central American and Caribbean Games medalists in athletics
Olympic female sprinters